Wardy Alfaro Pizarro (born 31 December 1977) is a retired Costa Rican football player, who currently is goalkeeper coach at Alajuelense.

He played as a goalkeeper, and was one of three that were named in the Costa Rica national squad for the 2006 World Cup held in Germany.

Club career
He started his career playing in the Costa Rican Second Division with Santos de Guápiles and then he moved to AD Guanacasteca. Then in 2001, Cartaginés decided to bring him to the top division. He debuted on September 16 of that year against Pérez Zeledón and soon became a valuable player for this team, helping them to stay at the top division with his great saves. By the end of the 2003-2004 season, Alajuelense decided to loan Ricardo González to the Guatemalan club Comunicaciones so they asked Cartaginés to have him loaned. He debuted with his new team on April 25 of 2004 and became usual at the starting line-up soon after he got to the team. By the end of this season Alajuelense decided to purchase him and he went on to play 154 league games for Liga.

In 2010, Alfaro rejoined his first club Santos and in 2012 he returned to Cartaginés. Besides football, he owns an inflatable games rental company in El Tejar de El Guarco where he lives.

In December 2014, Alfaro retired and was named goalkeeper coach at Alajuelense.

International career
Alfaro made his debut for Costa Rica in a friendly game against South Korea on 11 February 2006 and has earned 5 caps, scoring no goals. He has represented his country at the 2007 UNCAF Nations Cup and was a non-playing squad member at the 2006 FIFA World Cup and 2007 CONCACAF Gold Cup.

References

External links
 
 Estadísticas Jugadores del Club Sport Cartaginés Verano 2004 - Nación 

1977 births
Living people
People from Alajuela
Association football goalkeepers
Costa Rican footballers
Costa Rica international footballers
2006 FIFA World Cup players
2007 UNCAF Nations Cup players
2007 CONCACAF Gold Cup players
Santos de Guápiles footballers
C.S. Cartaginés players
L.D. Alajuelense footballers
Liga FPD players
Copa Centroamericana-winning players